Jean-Guillaume Moitte (11 November 1746, Paris – 2 May 1810, Paris) was a French sculptor.

Life 
Moitte was the son of Pierre-Etienne Moitte. He became the sculptor of Pigalle then Jean-Baptiste Lemoyne. He won the Prix de Rome for sculpture in 1768 with David carrying the head of Goliath in triumph.  He then entered the École royale des élèves protégés before a stay at the Rome, though it was cut short due to illness.

He worked for the king's goldsmith Auguste and participated in decorative works for monuments in capital. He was commissioned to produce sculptures of generals who had died in battle such as one of Custine for the musée de Versailles, the tomb of Louis Desaix at Grand Saint-Bernard or that of Leclerc at the Panthéon de Paris. He also designed and sculpted the pediment for the Panthéon during the French Revolution, with the theme of the Fatherland crowning the civil and heroic virtues Moitte and Philippe-Laurent Roland were the main sculptors for the exterior of the hôtel de Salm.

He was a member of the Institut de France, the Légion d'honneur and professor of the École des Beaux-Arts de Paris.

Works

Louvre
 Law, Numa, Manco Cápac, Moses and a pharaoh , bas-reliefs, bronze, Paris, musée du Louvre
 Minerva, statuette, terracotta, Paris, musée du Louvre
 The Triumph of Voltaire (1778), drawing, Paris, musée du Louvre, département des arts graphiques
 Orpheus in the underworld, drawing, Paris, musée du Louvre, département des arts graphiques
 Orpheus and Eurydice, drawing, Paris, musée du Louvre, département des arts graphiques
 Thucydides, Herodotus, Egyptian divinity and an Inca (1806), stone reliefs, Paris, palais du Louvre, cour Carrée, attic of the west façade, to the right of the Pavillon de l’Horloge

Hôtel de Salm, Palais de la Légion d’honneur
 Two Renommée, bas-reliefs, stone, main gate
 Festival of the Pales, bas-relief, stone, at the base of the courtyard
 Five bas-reliefs and six allegorical statues, stone, corps central quai Anatole-France
 Ceres, Mars and Diana, terracotta studies for statues on the coupole

Other
 Rousseau observing childhood's first steps, group, terracotta (1790), Paris, musée Carnavalet
 Dansers, frieze of the attic of the barrière d’Enfer, stone, Paris, place Denfert-Rochereau
 Portrait of Leonardo da Vinci, white marble bust, Fontainebleau, château
 The Rhine and The Nile, deux bas-reliefs for the tomb du général Desaix dans l’hospice du Grand-Saint-Bernard ainsi que ses deux plâtres modèles, bas-reliefs, Versailles, châteaux de Versailles et de Trianon
 Adam Philippe, comte de Custine, commander in chief (1742–1793) (Salon of 1810), larger-than-life-size marble statue, Versailles, châteaux de Versailles et de Trianon, completed by Jean-Baptiste Stouf
 Giovanni Domenico Cassini (1625–1712), terracotta equestrian statuette, Bayonne, musée Bonnat
 A sacrifice, drawing, Dijon, musée Magnin
 Departure (1798–1799), drawing, Vizille, Musée de la Révolution française
 Original bas-reliefs (destroyed) and two bronze lions (surviving), Column of the Grande Armée, Wimille
 Cornelia, mother of the Gracchi (1795), Mougins Museum of Classical Art

 Sources 
 Simone Hoog, (preface by Jean-Pierre Babelon, in collaboration with Roland Brossard), Musée national de Versailles. Les sculptures. I- Le musée, Réunion des musées nationaux, Paris, 1993.
 Pierre Kjellberg, Le Nouveau guide des statues de Paris, La Bibliothèque des Arts, Paris, 1988.
 Catalogue d’exposition, Skulptur aus dem Louvre. Sculptures françaises néo-classiques. 1760 - 1830'', Paris, musée du Louvre, 23 mai - 3 septembre 1990.

Notes

External links 

 Jean Guillaume Moitte on Joconde.
 

1746 births
1810 deaths
Artists from Paris
French architectural sculptors
18th-century French sculptors
French male sculptors
19th-century French sculptors
Prix de Rome for sculpture
Recipients of the Legion of Honour
Members of the Académie des beaux-arts
19th-century French male artists
18th-century French male artists